10 Second Ninja X is a 2016 platform game developed by Four Circle Interactive, and published by Curve Digital. The game was released on July 19, 2016 for PlayStation 4, PlayStation Vita, Microsoft Windows and Xbox One, and for Nintendo Switch on July 30, 2021.

Gameplay 

10 Second Ninja X is a sidescrolling puzzle platformer. The game follows a ninja who must destroy robots at high pace within a set time frame of 10 seconds. Every level is set with a timer, with the player having to finish the level within 10 seconds. The player has several attacks, including a projectile, that has limited capacity. Each level finishes when the player has destroyed all targets onscreen. The game features different star ratings for completed levels, with higher stars given for completing the missions in faster times.

Reception 

10 Second Ninja X received "generally favorable" reviews according to Metacritic.

References

External links 
 

2016 video games
Action video games
MacOS games
Nintendo Switch games
Video games about ninja
PlayStation 4 games
PlayStation Vita games
Puzzle-platform games
Side-scrolling platform games
Xbox One games
Single-player video games
Video games developed in the United Kingdom
Windows games
GameMaker Studio games
Curve Games games